The 1994 season of the Turkish Women's Football League is the first season of Turkey's premier women's football league. In its meeting on 22 December 1993, the Turkish Football Federation decided to officially establish a women's football league in Turkey. The league consisted of 16 totally amateur clubs competing in four groups. The league started with group matches on 2 April 1994, and ended on 21 May 1994 with the final match played. Dinarsuspor became the first league champion after defeating Acarlarspor with 3–1 in the final.

Teams

League table
Group 1

Group 2

Group 3

Group 4

Green marks a team promoted to the semi-finals.

 Final

Dinarsuspor  3–1  Acarlarspor

1993–94 domestic women's association football leagues
1994